Oberea pagana is a species of flat-faced longhorn beetle in the tribe Saperdini in the genus Oberea, discovered by Harold in 1880.

References

P
Beetles described in 1880